The Janet Heidinger Kafka Prize is a literary award presented annually for the "best book-length work of prose fiction" by an American woman. The award has been given by the Susan B. Anthony Institute for Gender and Women's Studies and the Department of English at the University of Rochester since 1975.

Each winner is awarded $15,000.

The prize is named for a 30-year-old editor killed in an auto accident. Family, friends, and associates in the publishing industry endowed the prize as a memorial to Kafka and "the literary standards and personal ideals for which she stood".

Winners

See also

 List of literary awards honoring women
 List of American literary awards

Notes

External links

American literary awards
University of Rochester
Literary awards honoring women
Awards established in 1975
Women's studies